Aljamiado (trans. ʿajamiyah ) or Aljamía texts are manuscripts that use the Arabic script for transcribing European languages, especially Romance languages such as Mozarabic, Aragonese, Portuguese, Spanish or Ladino.

According to Anwar G. Chejne, Aljamiado or Aljamía is "a corruption of the Arabic word ʿajamiyah (in this case it means foreign language) and, generally, the Arabic expression ʿajam and its derivative ʿajamiyah are applicable to peoples whose ancestry is not of Arabian origin". During the Arab conquest of Persia, the term became a racial pejorative. In linguistic terms, the Aljamía is the use of the Arabic alphabet to transcribe a Romance language. It was used by some people in some areas of Al-Andalus as an everyday communication vehicle,  while Arabic was reserved as the language of science, high culture, and religion.

The systematic writing of Romance-language texts in Arabic scripts appears to have begun in the fifteenth century, and the overwhelming majority of such texts that can be dated belong to the sixteenth century. A key aljamiado text is the compilation Suma de los principales mandamientos y devediamentos de nuestra santa ley y sunna by the  mufti of Segovia, of 1462.

In later times, Moriscos were banned from using Arabic as a religious language, and wrote in Spanish on Islamic subjects. Examples are the Coplas del alhichante de Puey Monzón, narrating a Hajj, or the Poema de Yuçuf on the Biblical Joseph (written in Aragonese).

Usage by the Moriscos during the persecution of Muslims in Spain

Aljamiado played a very important role  in preserving Islam and the Arabic language in the life of the Moriscos of Castile and Aragon; Valencian and Granadan Moriscos spoke and wrote in Andalusi Arabic. After the fall of the last Muslim kingdom on the Iberian peninsula, the Moriscos (Muslims in parts of what was once Al-Andalus) were forced to convert to Christianity or leave the peninsula. They were forced to adopt Christian customs and traditions and to attend church services on Sundays. Nevertheless, some of the Moriscos kept their Islamic belief and traditions secretly, and this included the usage of Aljamiado.

In 1567, Philip II of Spain issued a royal decree in Spain, which forced Moriscos to abandon using Arabic on all occasions, formal and informal, speaking and writing. Using Arabic in any sense of the word would be regarded as a crime. They were given three years to learn the language of the Christian Spanish, after which they would have to get rid of all Arabic written material. Moriscos of Castile and Aragon translated all prayers and the Hadith (sayings of the Prophet Muhammad) into Aljamiado transcriptions of the Spanish language, while keeping all Qur'anic verses in the original Arabic. Aljamiado scrolls were circulated amongst the Moriscos. Historians came to know about Aljamiado literature only in the early nineteenth century. Some of the Aljamiado scrolls are kept in the Spanish National Library in Madrid.

Transcription

Vowels 
The long vowels in Arabic were used to write the stressed vowels in Romance languages and the short vowels were used for unstressed vowels.

In turn, these three vowels were written as three different letters when they occupied the final position.

Since the vowels /e/ and /o/ did not exist in Arabic, they were created as a combination of short and long vowels without differentiating between unstressed and stressed vowels.

Some texts simplified this system by writing all vowels as short vowels, without differentiating between unstressed, stressed, and final vowels.

Consonants 
Muslim writers solved the absence of certain phonemes in Arabic by modifying certain letters using the diacritical mark for gemination.

Sometimes the same letter was used without marking it with a shadda, which has caused ambiguities in some cases. The sound /p/ was represented on rare occasions as ف (f) and فّ (double f).

Some letters simply adopted another value or were solved through digraphs.

The phoneme /β/ was typically represented by the letter ب (b), though in some instances it was represented by the letter ف (f). The plosive consonants were required to be aspirated; however, this aspect was lost in weaker positions such as the initial position of a word or an intervocalic position. In Aljamiado texts, the letter ط was utilized to represent the phoneme /t/ in initial and intervocalic positions where it was unaspirated, while the letter ت was utilized in postconsonantal positions to indicate the aspirated form of the phoneme. Similarly, the letter ﻕ was used to represent the phoneme /k/ in initial and intervocalic positions where it was unaspirated, and the letter ﻙ was used in postconsonantal positions to indicate the aspirated form. However, it must be noted that according to the glossary of Abuljair, the aspiration of plosive consonants never ceased to occur in any position.

Other uses 
The practice of Jews writing Romance languages such as Spanish, Aragonese or Catalan in the Hebrew script is also referred to as aljamiado.

The word aljamiado is sometimes used for other non-Semitic language written in Arabic letters:
 Bosnian and Albanian texts written in Arabic script during the Ottoman period have been referred to as aljamiado. However, many linguists prefer to limit the term to Romance languages, instead using Arebica to refer to the use of Arabic script for Slavic languages like Bosnian.
 The word Aljamiado is also used to refer to Greek written in the Arabic/Ottoman alphabet.

See also 
 Mozarabic language
 Kharjas
 :Category:Arabic alphabets
 Arabic Afrikaans
 Karamanli Turkish
 Jawi (script)
 Ajami script
 Arebica
 Elifbaja shqip
 Xiaoerjing
 Judeo-Spanish

References and notes

Further reading
 Los Siete Alhaicales y otras plegarias de mudéjares y moriscos by Xavier Casassas Canals published by Almuzara, Sevilla (Spain), 2007.

External links
 A bilingual Arabic-aljamiado Qur'an from the fifteenth century
 Aljamiado (Texts and Studies) 
 Alhadith: Morisco Literature & Culture A website devoted to the literature and language of the Moriscos; contains a multilingual bibliography, digital texts, and a catalogue of aljamiado-morisco manuscripts.

15th century in Al-Andalus
Arabic alphabets
Spanish language
Moriscos